Victor Potel (October 12, 1889 – March 8, 1947) was an American film character actor who began in the silent era and appeared in more than 430 films in his 38-year career.

Career
Victor Potel was born in Lafayette, Indiana in 1889, and his acting career goes back almost to the beginning of the commercial film industry in the United States. He made his first silent film in 1910, a comedy short filmed in Chicago by Essanay Film Manufacturing Company called A Dog on Business.  Potel continued to make films for Essanay, appearing in dozens of films every year, including most of the Broncho Billy series, and played a character called "Slippery Slim" in 80 movies. He also appeared in Universal Pictures' "Snakeville" series.

Potel's first talking picture was Melody of Love, starring Walter Pidgeon, made for Universal in 1928, and in the sound era he continued to work continuously and constantly, playing small parts and sometimes uncredited bit parts, all primarily comic roles due to his height and gawkiness.

In addition to acting, on several occasions Potel also wrote and directed. In the 1920s he directed two silent shorts, The Rubber-Neck in 1924 and Action Craver in 1927, and contributed the story for Saxophobia in 1927. In the following decade, in the sound era, he was the dialogue director for The Big Chance (1933), and wrote the story for Inside Information in 1934). In 1935 he provided continuity and dialogue for Million Dollar Haul and the screenplay for Hot Off the Press. In the 1940s, Potel was part of Preston Sturges' unofficial "stock company" of character actors, appearing in nine films written and directed by Sturges.

Potel continued to work right up until his death on March 8, 1947. The final film he worked on, Relentless finished filming on February 28 of that year.

Selected filmography
Silent

 A Dog on Business (1910, Short)
 Across the Plains (1911, Short)
 Alkali Ike's Auto (1911, Short)
 The Good-for-Nothing (1914) - Old Clerk
 His Regeneration (1915, Short) - Pawn Shop Clerk (uncredited)
 Baseball Madness (1917, Short)
 Captain Kidd, Jr. (1919) - Constable Sam
 Full of Pep (1919) - Beanpole
 The Amateur Adventuress (1919) - Gregory Charles Sentel
 The Outcasts of Poker Flat (1919)
 The Petal on the Current (1919) - Skinny Flint
 In Mizzoura (1919) - Dave
 Water, Water, Everywhere (1920) - Steve Brainard
 Mary's Ankle (1920) - Johnny Stokes
 The Heart of a Child (1920) - Charley Peastone
 Billions (1920) - Pushkin
 Bob Hampton of Placer (1921) - Willie McNeil
 One a Minute (1921) - Jingo Pitts
 Lavender and Old Lace (1921) - Joe Pendleton
 At the Sign of the Jack O'Lantern (1922) - The Poet
 I Can Explain (1922) - Will Potter
 Don't Write Letters (1922) - The Lover
 Step on It! (1922) - Noisy Johnson
 The Loaded Door (1922) - Slim
 A Tailor-Made Man (1922) - Peter
 Quincy Adams Sawyer (1922) - Hiram Maxwell
 Refuge (1923) - Alphpmse
 Modern Matrimony (1923) - Junior Rutherford
 Penrod and Sam (1923) - Town Drunkard
 Itching Palms (1923) - The Village Dumbbell
 Tea: With a Kick! (1923) - Bellboy 13
 The Meanest Man in the World (1923) - Lute Boon
 Anna Christie (1923) - Minor Role (uncredited)
 Reno (1923) - Detective McRae
 Women Who Give (1924) - Ephraim Doolittle
 The Law Forbids (1924) - Joel Andrews
 A Self-Made Failure (1924) - Pokey Jones
 Along Came Ruth (1924) - Oscar Sims
 A Lost Lady (1924) - Ivy Peters
 Ten Days (1925) - Constable
 Contraband (1925) - George Bogardus
 Beyond the Border (1925) - Man in Smallpox (credited as Vic Potel)
 Below the Line (1925) - 'Cuckoo' Niles
 What Price Beauty (1925)
 The Bar-C Mystery (1926)
 Morganson's Finish (1926) - Ole Jensen
 The Lodge in the Wilderness (1926) - Goofus
 The Carnival Girl (1926) - Slim
 Racing Romance (1926) - Constable
 Uneasy Payments (1927) - Press Agent
 Special Delivery (1927) - Nip, a detective (scenes deleted)
 The Little Shepherd of Kingdom Come (1928) - Tom Turner
 Lingerie (1928) - Leroy's Buddy
 Captain Swagger (1928) - Jean

Sound

 Melody of Love (1928) - The Gawk
 Border Romance (1929) - Slim
 The Virginian (1929) - Nebrasky
 The Bad One (1930) - Sailor
 Call of the West (1930) - Trig Peters
 Paradise Island (1930) - Swede
 Doughboys (1930) - Svendenburg
 The Virtuous Sin (1930) - Sentry
 De frente, marchen (1930) - Adormidera
 Scandal Sheet (1931) - Reporter (uncredited)
 Ten Cents a Dance (1931) - Smith, a Sailor
 King of the Wild (1931) - Peterson
 The Squaw Man (1931) - Andy
 Partners (1932) - Deputy Lem
 Make Me a Star (1932) - Actor in 'Wide Open Spaces' (uncredited)
 The Purchase Price (1932) - Clyde (uncredited)
 Face in the Sky (1933) - Ed Burns, Carnival Patron (uncredited)
 Hallelujah, I'm a Bum (1933) - The General (uncredited)
 Damaged Lives (1933) - Policeman
 Dancing Lady (1933) - Worker (uncredited)
 Twisted Rails (1934) - Tom Watson
 Inside Information (1934) - Rice - Thin Detective
 Thunder Over Texas (1934) - Dick
 Frontier Days (1934) - Deputy Tex Hatch
 Big Boy Rides Again (1935) - Scarface
 Ruggles of Red Gap (1935) - Curly - Cowboy (uncredited)
 The Marriage Bargain (1935) - Jeff Thompson
 Mississippi (1935) - Guest (uncredited)
 The Drunkard (1935) - Farmer Gates
 The Cowboy and the Bandit (1935) - Lanky - Henchman (uncredited)
 Million Dollar Haul (1935) - Schultz - Florist / Henchman (uncredited)
 Whispering Smith Speaks (1935) - Bill Prouty
 Hard Rock Harrigan (1935) - 'Big' Oscar
 Lady Tubbs (1935) - Slim (uncredited)
 The Adventures of Rex and Rinty (1935, Serial) - Kinso, Royal Guard Commander [Chs. 1, 10-12]
 Western Frontier (1935) - Slim (uncredited)
 Trails End (1935) - Red
 The Girl Friend (1935) - Small Town Farmer (uncredited)
 Waterfront Lady (1935) - Alex
 She Couldn't Take It (1935) - Farmer (uncredited)
 Shipmates Forever (1935) - Radio Fan (uncredited)
 Barbary Coast (1935) - Wilkins (uncredited)
 Moonlight on the Prairie (1935) - Tall Cowboy (uncredited)
 The Last of the Clintons (1935) - Jed Clinton
 The Fighting Marines (1935, Serial) - Henchman - Fake Native Chief [Ch. 12]
 Gun Play (1935) - Brawler (uncredited)
 Hot Off the Press (1935)
 The Broken Coin (1936)
 Man Hunt (1936) - Townsman Pointing Out Shefiff's Office (uncredited)
 The Milky Way (1936) - Todd Fight Spectator (uncredited)
 Yellow Dust (1936) - Jugger - the Bartender
 The Music Goes 'Round (1936) - Garage Attendant (uncredited)
 Song of the Saddle (1936) - Little Casino
 Three Godfathers (1936) - 'Buck Tooth'
 O'Malley of the Mounted (1936) - Gabby - the Cook
 Down to the Sea (1936) - Andy
 Fury (1936) - Jorgeson - Barber Shop Customer (uncredited)
 We Went to College (1936) - Boatman (uncredited)
 The Captain's Kid (1936) - Deputy Jake Hutchinson
 Four Days' Wonder (1936) - Postman (uncredited)
 Arizona Mahoney (1936) - Stagecoach Helper Elmer (uncredited)
 Laughing at Trouble (1936) - Lem Parker (uncredited)
 Lady from Nowhere (1936) - Abner
 God's Country and the Woman (1937) - Turpentine
 Racing Lady (1937) - Mr. Mitchell (uncredited)
 Two Gun Law (1937) - Cassius
 A Day at the Races (1937) - Horn Blower (uncredited)
 Married Before Breakfast (1937) - Tall Hobo Being Shaved (uncredited)
 White Bondage (1937) - Luke Stacey (uncredited)
 Western Gold (1937) - Jasper
 On Such a Night (1937) - Louisiana Sharecropper (uncredited)
 Small Town Boy (1937) - Abner Towner
 Adventure's End (1937) - Tall Sailor (uncredited)
 Swing Your Lady (1938) - Clem (uncredited)
 The Girl of the Golden West (1938) - Lem - Stagecoach Driver (uncredited)
 On the Great White Trail (1938) - Lyons (uncredited)
 The Strange Case of Dr. Meade (1938) - Steve
 Stand Up and Fight (1939) - Coach Driver (uncredited)
 Let Freedom Ring (1939) - Ole Swensen - 2nd Swede (uncredited)
 Down the Wyoming Trail (1939) - Slim (uncredited)
 The Housekeeper's Daughter (1939) - Suspect (uncredited)
 Heaven with a Barbed Wire Fence (1939) - Ranch Hand (uncredited)
 Blondie Brings Up Baby (1939) - Lars (uncredited)
 Rovin' Tumbleweeds (1939) - Man in Store
 Chip of the Flying U (1939) - Station Agent (uncredited)
 Slightly Honorable (1939) - Gasoline Station Proprietor (uncredited)
 West of Carson City (1940) - Ranch Hand Gabby (uncredited)
 Young Tom Edison (1940) - Mr. Tompkins (uncredited)
 Enemy Agent (1940) - George (uncredited)
 Three Faces West (1940) - Postman (uncredited)
 The Great McGinty (1940) - Cook (uncredited)
 Girl from God's Country (1940) - Barber
 The Villain Still Pursued Her (1940) - Policeman (uncredited)
 Christmas in July (1940) - Davenola Salesman
 Li'l Abner (1940) - Fantastic Brown
 Trail of the Vigilantes (1940) - Conductor (uncredited)
 Road Show (1941) - Rube (uncredited)
 The Lady Eve (1941) - Third Ship's Waiter (uncredited)
 A Girl, a Guy and a Gob (1941) - Bystander Eating Popcorn (uncredited)
 Las Vegas Nights (1941) - Cowboy Onlooker at Slot Machine (uncredited)
 Pot o' Gold (1941) - Olaf Svenson (uncredited)
 The Devil and Miss Jones (1941) - Attendant at First Bath House (uncredited)
 The Lady from Cheyenne (1941) - Lem (uncredited)
 Ride on Vaquero (1941) - Ole (uncredited)
 The Big Store (1941) - Swedish Blonde Children's Father (uncredited)
 Puddin' Head (1941) - Hillbilly
 New Wine (1941) - Minor Role (uncredited)
 Never Give a Sucker an Even Break (1941) - Russian Magistrate Clines (uncredited)
 Nothing but the Truth (1941) - Pedestrian (scenes deleted)
 Birth of the Blues (1941) - Trumpet Player in Beer Garden (uncredited)
 Look Who's Laughing (1941) - Mr. Bagworthy, the Postman (uncredited)
 Sullivan's Travels (1941) - Cameraman
 The Palm Beach Story (1942) - Mr. McKeewie
 The Man in the Trunk (1942) - Deaf Floor Man (uncredited)
 The Valley of Vanishing Men (1942, Serial) - Townsman (uncredited)
 The Sky's the Limit (1943) - Joe - Second Bartender (uncredited)
 The Good Fellows (1943) - Branders (uncredited)
 Girl Crazy (1943) - Station Master (uncredited)
 The Miracle of Morgan's Creek (1943) - Newspaper Editor
 It Happened Tomorrow (1944) - Joe (uncredited)
 The Great Moment (1944) - First Dental Patient
 Hail the Conquering Hero (1944) - Progressive Bandleader (uncredited)
 Kansas City Kitty (1944) - Painter (uncredited)
 Goin' to Town (1944) - (uncredited)
 Can't Help Singing (1944) - Guide (uncredited)
 Strange Illusion (1945) - Mac - Game Warden
 A Medal for Benny (1945) - Pepster (uncredited)
 Flame of Barbary Coast (1945) - Train Fireman (uncredited)
 Rhythm Round-Up (1945) - Slim Jensen
 Captain Tugboat Annie (1945) - Swenson
 The Glass Alibi (1946) - Gas Attendant
 They Made Me a Killer (1946) - Willoughby (uncredited)
 The Return of Rusty (1946) - Gas Station Attendant (uncredited)
 Heldorado (1946) - Desert Springs Station Agent (uncredited)
 The Shocking Miss Pilgrim (1947) - Speaker (uncredited)
 Calendar Girl (1947) - Fireman (uncredited)
 The Sin of Harold Diddlebock (1947) - Prof. Potelle
 The Devil Thumbs a Ride (1947) - Minnie's Old Man (uncredited)
 Ramrod (1947) - Burch Nellice
 The Egg and I (1947) - Crowbar
 The Farmer's Daughter (1947) - Farmer with Destroyed Property (uncredited)
 Yankee Fakir (1947) - Contest Chairman (uncredited)
 The Millerson Case (1947) - Hank Nixon (uncredited)
 Relentless (1948) - Barfly (uncredited)

References

External links

 
 
 

1889 births
1947 deaths
American male film actors
American male silent film actors
Male actors from Indiana
20th-century American male actors